Jussi Nikkilä (born 28 June 1982 in Lahti) is a Finnish actor.

Selected filmography

Young Gods (2003)
Beauty and the Bastard (2005)
Ganes (2007)
Sixpack (2011)
Love and Other Troubles (2012)

References

External links

Finnish male film actors
1982 births
Living people
People from Lahti
21st-century Finnish male actors